Pozm or Pazm, also known as Puzm or Puzim, may refer to:
 Pozm-e Machchan
 Pozm-e Tiab